Open de Suède Vårgårda is an elite professional women's road bicycle event held annually in the Vårgårda Municipality of Sweden.  Created in 2006, the Open de Suède Vårgårda was part of the UCI Women's Road World Cup until 2015 and sanctioned by the Swedish Cycling Federation. Since 2016, the race has been part of the new UCI Women's World Tour.

Since 2008, a team time trial has been held in conjunction with the main race as a part of the UCI Women's Road World Cup.

Past winners

Road Race

Team time trial

External links
 World Cup Vargarda
  (road race)
  (team time trial)

 
Recurring sporting events established in 2006
UCI Women's Road World Cup
Cycle races in Sweden
2006 establishments in Sweden
Women's road bicycle races
Summer events in Sweden
UCI Women's World Tour races